State Route 727 (SR 727) is a north–south state highway located in the southwestern portion of the U.S. state of Ohio. The route provides access to Stonelick State Park.

Route description

All of SR 727 is nestled within the northeastern corner of Clermont County and follows the course of the Stonelick Creek for its entire length. SR 727 begins at an intersection with SR 131 in Stonelick Township and heads northeast. Almost immediately, it enters Wayne Township where it remains for the remainder of the route. The route passes through Modest, and continues northeast through a mix of residential areas, farmlands, and forested areas until it curves sharply to the northwest at the border of Stonelick State Park. SR 727 passes two park access roads before it crosses over the creek in front of the dam impounding Stonelick Lake. The route then curves back to the northeast curving around the lake along the way. Here, the park is on the southern side of the road while residences line the north side. Upon reaching the unincorporated community of Edenton, SR 727 ends at an intersection with SR 133. The route is not included as a component of the National Highway System, a network of routes determined to be the most important for the economy, mobility and defense of the nation.

History
SR 727 was established in 1937.  It has generally maintained the same northeastern Clermont County routing between SR 131 and SR 133 from its inception to the present day. The only change in the routing occurred in 1950 when the creation of Stonelick Lake forced the almost-straight route to be rerouted around the north side of the lake.

Major intersections

References

External links

727
Transportation in Clermont County, Ohio